The 2023 Nigerian presidential election in Bayelsa State will be held on 25 February 2023 as part of the nationwide 2023 Nigerian presidential election to elect the president and vice president of Nigeria. Other federal elections, including elections to the House of Representatives and the Senate, will also be held on the same date while state elections will be held two weeks afterward on 11 March.

Background
Bayelsa State is a small state in the South South mainly populated by Ijaw peoples; although its oil reserves make it one of the most resource-rich states in the nation, Bayelsa has faced challenges in security and environmental degradation in large part due to years of systemic corruption and illegal oil bunkering.

Politically, the state's early 2019 elections were categorized as the continuation of the PDP's dominance albeit with the APC making considerable gains by gaining one senate and two House of Representatives seats. The APC also gained ground in the assembly election and Bayelsa also was the state that swung the most towards Buhari in the presidential election, although that could be chalked up to former Governor Goodluck Jonathan no longer being PDP nominee. Later in 2019, the swing towards the APC dramatically increased as its gubernatorial nominee David Lyon won by a large margin but Diri was declared victor after Lyon was disqualified before the inauguration.

Polling

Projections

General election

Results

By senatorial district 
The results of the election by senatorial district.

By federal constituency
The results of the election by federal constituency.

By local government area 
The results of the election by local government area.

See also 
 2023 Bayelsa State elections
 2023 Nigerian presidential election

Notes

References 

Bayelsa State gubernatorial election
2023 Bayelsa State elections
Bayelsa